Mao Xiaotong (born 16 February 1988), also known as Rachel Momo, is a Chinese actress. She is best known for her supporting roles in Empresses in the Palace (2012), Love O2O (2016) and The Princess Weiyoung (2016).

Early life and education
Mao took keyboard and vocal lessons since youth, and has gone on to learn competitive ballroom dancing such as Latin dance and dancesport. She studied performing arts at Central Academy of Drama.

Career
Mao Xiaotong started to get recognition after appearing as a supporting role in Empresses in the Palace (2013), a critically acclaimed historical drama starring Sun Li. In 2012, she starred in wuxia drama The Magic Blade and was nominated at the LeTV Awards for Best New Actress for her performance.

Mao subsequently gained more recognition for her role as Zhong Ling in The Demi-Gods and Semi-Devils (2013). Thereafter Mao also starred in Sword Family Women (2014),  The Romance of the Condor Heroes (2014) and Love Yunge from the Desert (2015).

In 2016, Mao gained more popularity for playing notable supporting roles in popular dramas Love O2O and The Princess Weiyoung.

In 2017, Mao played her first leading role in Hunan TV's romantic comedy drama Delicious Destiny.

In 2019, Mao starred in the science fiction romance drama My Robot Boyfriend, and modern workplace drama Who's not Rebellious Youth.

In 2020, Mao starred in the tomb-raiding web series Reunion: The Sound of the Providence, adapted from the Daomu Biji series. The same year, she starred in the female-centric modern drama Nothing But Thirty.

Filmography

Film

Television series

Discography

Awards and nominations

References

External links 
 

1988 births
Living people
Actresses from Tianjin
Chinese film actresses
Chinese television actresses
Central Academy of Drama alumni
21st-century Chinese actresses